Vega and Vega-Lite are visualization tools implementing a grammar of graphics, similar to ggplot2. The Vega and Vega-Lite grammars extend Leland Wilkinson's Grammar of Graphics. by adding a novel grammar of interactivity to assist in the exploration of complex datasets.

Vega acts as a low-level language suited to explanatory figures (the same use case as D3.js), while Vega-Lite
is a higher-level language suited to rapidly exploring data. Vega is used in the back end of several data visualization systems, for example Voyager. Chart specifications are written in JSON and rendered in a browser or exported to either vector or bitmap images. Bindings for Vega-Lite have been written for in several programming languages, for example
the python package Altair  to make it easier to use. The grammars and associated tools are open source projects led by the University of Washington Interactive Data Lab and released under a BSD-3 license

References 

Visualization software
Free software programmed in JavaScript
JavaScript libraries
JavaScript visualization toolkits
Software using the BSD license
Visualization API